Junortoun is a suburb of Bendigo, Victoria, Australia. At the 2016 census, Junortoun had a population of 3,201.

History 
The original inhabitants of Junortoun were the Dja Dja Warrung people who lived throughout the Loddon Valley for thousands of years prior to European settlement. It was originally established as “Homebush”, centred around the "Homebush" Estate. Homebush was an estate of some 2,000 acres extending along the valley of Splitters Creek, and was also the receiving Post Office for the district up until the early 1970s.

The name was changed to Junortoun around 1912 to avoid confusion with Homebush, New South Wales. The owner of "Homebush" estate proposed the name "Junor" after his wife's maiden name and this was submitted to the authorities. However, this name was rejected on the grounds that it was too close to "Junee" in New South Wales. At a subsequent meeting the suffix "toun" was added to "Junor" and again submitted and this was found to be acceptable.

Junortoun is one of the many localities in the region that can trip-up and tongue-tie visitors with its pronunciation. Junortoun is in fact pronounced as joo-ner-t'n. 

Junortoun is surrounded by the Bendigo suburbs of East Bendigo, Strathdale, Kennington, Strathfieldsaye and the outer-rural suburbs of Longlea and Wellsford.

Today, Junortoun is a growing residential suburb, comprising a mix of low, medium and high-density residential land.

Community facilities

Schools
Junortoun includes the Coolock campus of Catholic secondary school Catherine McAuley College. The campus was originally established in 1954 by the Vincentian Fathers. In 1977 governance changed to the Marist Brothers, and in 1983 governance changed to a partnership between the Marist Brothers and the Sisters of Mercy. In January 2013, the campus became the sole governance of the Sisters of Mercy and in 2018, the school was renamed from Catholic College Bendigo (CCB), signifying the end to the Sisters of Mercy and the Marist Brothers governance partnership formed in 1983 and became known as Catherine McAuley College.

Sporting facilities
Lords Raceway is home to the Bendigo Harness Racing Club and greyhound racing organised by the Bendigo Greyhound Racing Association.

Other facilities
Junortoun has a CFA station, a Baptist Church, pub and an army training base.

The O'Keefe Rail Trail runs through the suburb and is a sandy gravel trail that runs along a former branch line on the Melbourne-Sydney rail line. The disused railway track has been converted into a multi-use path, typically used for walking and cycling.

References

Suburbs of Bendigo
Bendigo